Yevgeni Leonidovich Shipovskiy (born on 13 March 1962) is a former Russian professional football player.

Club career
He made his Russian Football National League debut for FC Dynamo Barnaul on 6 May 1992 in a game against FC Sakhalin Yuzhno-Sakhalinsk.

Honours
 Russian Second Division Zone 7 top scorer: 1993 (20 goals).

External links
 

1962 births
Living people
Soviet footballers
Russian footballers
FC Dynamo Barnaul players
FC Yugra Nizhnevartovsk players
Association football forwards
FC Novokuznetsk players